Tarzan is a character created by writer Edgar Rice Burroughs. 

Tarzan may also refer to:

Literature 
 Tarzan (book series)
 Tarzan in comics
 Tarzan: The Greystoke Legacy, a 2011 young-adult novel by Andy Briggs

Film and stage 

 Tarzan the Ape Man (1932 film), starring Johnny Weissmuller
 Tarzan, the Ape Man (1981 film), starring Bo Derek and Miles O'Keeffe
 Greystoke: The Legend of Tarzan, Lord of the Apes, a 1984 British film
 Tarzan (1999 film), Disney's 1999 animated film
 Tarzan: An Original Walt Disney Records Soundtrack, the soundtrack
 Tarzan (musical), a 2006 Disney Broadway musical based on the 1999 film
 Tarzan II, Disney's 2005 animated film
 Tarzan (2013 film), a CGI animated film
 The Legend of Tarzan (film), starring Alexander Skarsgård

Television 

 Tarzan (1966 TV series), an American series starring Ron Ely that aired on NBC
 Tarzan, Lord of the Jungle, an animated CBS series that aired 1976–80
 Tarzan in Manhattan, a 1989 CBS TV movie
 Tarzán, a French-Canadian-Mexican TV series that aired 1991–94
 Tarzan: The Epic Adventures, an American TV series that aired in syndication for the 1996–97 season
 The Legend of Tarzan (TV series), an animated UPN series that aired 2001–02
 Tarzan (2003 TV series), an American series starring Travis Fimmel that aired on The WB

Video games
 Tarzan: Lord of the Jungle, a 1994 game
 Disney's Tarzan, a 1999 platform game

People
 Tarzan (nickname)
 Tarzan (born 1970), Russian actor, singer and bodybuilder Sergei Glushko
 Tarzan Milošević (born 1954), Montenegrin politician, Prime Minister Igor Lukšić's Agriculture Minister
 Tarzan Goto (born 1963), Japanese wrestler (Masaji Goto)
 Tarzán López (1912–1975), Mexican wrestler (Carlos López)
 Tarzan Taborda (1935–2005), Portuguese wrestler (Albano Taborda)
 Tarzan Tyler (1927-1985), Canadian wrestler (Camille Tourville)
 João Tarzan (b.1994), Portuguese footballer (João Miguel Ferreira Rodrigues)

Places
 Tarzan, Iran, a village in Lorestan Province
 Tarzan, Texas, an unincorporated community
 Tarzan River, Guam

Other uses
 Tarzan, a generic title for three old-time radio series, two in the 1930s and one in the 1950s.
 Tarzan (franchise)
 AutoVAZ Tarzan, a Russian 4-wheel drive vehicle manufactured by AutoVAZ
 Tarzán, the college mascot from the University of Puerto Rico at Mayagüez
 A character in the 1991 Hong Kong film, Riki-Oh: The Story of Ricky (in the English language dub version)
 The mascot of the former Stockton High School in Stockton, California
 "Tarzan Boy"; title of a song in a 1985 debut single by Baltimora

See also
 
 ASM-A-1 Tarzon, an American air-to-surface missile
 Taarzan: The Wonder Car, a 2004 romantic thriller Bollywood film